The 2001–02 Eastern Michigan Eagles men's basketball team represented Eastern Michigan University during the 2001–02 NCAA Division I men's basketball season. The Eagles, led by 2nd year head coach Jim Boone. The Eagles played their home games at the Eastern Michigan University Convocation Center and were members of the West Division of the Mid-American Conference. They finished the season 6–24, 2–16 in MAC play. They finished 6th in the MAC West. They were knocked out in the 1st round of the MAC Tournament by the Toledo Rockets.

Roster
Source:

The team captains were Ricky Cottrill, Steve Pettyjohn and Ryan Prillman.

Schedule

|-
!colspan=9| Regular Season

|-
!colspan=9| 2002 MAC men's basketball tournament

Season Highlights

11/26 vs Maryland Eastern Shore 
 Ryan Prillman records a career-high 14 rebounds.

12/01 vs Tennessee Tech 
 Ricky Cottrill sets individual three-point shooting record at EMU Convocation Center with 8 three-point field goal. 
 EMU sets a team record with 14 three-point field goals. 
 EMU sets a Convocation Center record with 14 three-point field goals.

12/03 vs Detroit 
 Ryan Prillman scores a career-high 24 points.

01/07 at Akron 
 Ricky Cottrill scores a career-high 31 points.
 EMU wins its first MAC road game under head coach Jim Boone.

References

Eastern Michigan Eagles men's basketball seasons
Eastern Michigan
2001 in sports in Michigan
2002 in sports in Michigan